The 2009–10 Biathlon World Cup – World Cup 8 was the eighth event of the season and was held in Oslo, Norway from Thursday, March 18 until Sunday, March 21, 2010.

Schedule of events
The schedule of the event is below

Medal winners

Men

Women

Achievements
 Best performance for all time

 , 4 place in Sprint
 , 9 place in Sprint and 2 place in Pursuit
 , 35 place in Sprint and 31 place in Pursuit
 , 62 place in Sprint
 , 91 place in Sprint
 , 10 place in Pursuit
 , 36 place in Pursuit
 , 5 place in Sprint
 , 51 place in Sprint and 48 place in Pursuit
 , 52 place in Sprint
 , 28 place in Pursuit

 First World Cup race

 , 52 place in Sprint
 , 56 place in Sprint
 , 59 place in Sprint
 , 85 place in Sprint
 , 96 place in Sprint
 , 64 place in Sprint
 , 78 place in Sprint

References

- World Cup 8, 2009-10 Biathlon World Cup
March 2010 sports events in Europe
2010s in Oslo
International sports competitions in Oslo
Biathlon competitions in Norway
2010 in Norwegian sport